Radioactive Man (real name Chen Lu) is a fictional supervillain appearing in American comic books published by Marvel Comics. Various other individuals in the Marvel Universe with similar powers have also used the name Radioactive Man for short periods of time.

Publication history
The Chen Lu version of Radioactive Man first appears in Journey into Mystery #93 (June 1963), and was created by Stan Lee and Jack Kirby.

The Igor Stancheck version of Radioactive Man first appears in Black Panther vol. 4 #3 (June 2005) and was created by Reginald Hudlin and John Romita Jr.

Green Death of Eurth is an imaginary creation from Avataars: Covenant of the Shield #3 (Nov 2000) created by Len Kaminski.

Warhead is another short-lived adolescent iteration from Young Allies vol. 2 #1 (Jun 2011) with Sean McKeever and David Baldeón as creators/illustrators.

The Radioactive Kid is a teenage iteration of a different character who featured in Vengeance #1 (Jul 2011) made by Nick Dragotta and Joe Casey.

Fictional character biography

Chen Lu
Chen Lu is a nuclear physicist and Communist agent in the People's Republic of China. Ordered to find a way to defeat Thor - who thwarts the Red Army's invasion of India - the character exposes himself to small doses of radiation until he is able to endure a massive barrage, becoming a living "Radioactive Man". He plans to take over the world.

Traveling to New York City, Chen battles Thor who is first defeated when Chen hypnotizes Thor into throwing the hammer away. But Donald Blake is able to recover the hammer from a river, and defeats the villain by creating a vortex, sending Chen back to China, where he apparently explodes.

Radioactive Man becomes a recurring foe of the Avengers, being coerced by Baron Zemo to join the original Masters of Evil in a bid to destroy the Avengers. He is the first to confront the Avengers, and sticks Captain America and Giant-Man to the pavement with an adhesive, which Thor dodges. He is defeated by Giant-Man and Iron Man when they imprison him in lead coils. He is then deported back to China. The character reappears with the new Masters of Evil, organized by the robot Ultron. The villains, however, are betrayed by the Black Knight. Radioactive Man and his teammates appear once again during a Halloween parade and are defeated by a coalition of superheroines called the Lady Liberators.

Chen escapes and travels to Vietnam, where he joins Soviet villains Titanium Man and Crimson Dynamo as part of a team called the Titanic Three. Acting as crime fighters in Vietnam, the trio is duped by a con man and petty thief called the Slasher and end up battling the Avengers until the deception is uncovered. After an encounter with Iron Man, the characters go their separate ways. After a humiliating defeat by time-traveling villain Kang the Conqueror in Giant-Size Avengers, Chen joins another incarnation of the Masters of Evil - led by Egghead - but is defeated by Ant-Man and deported back to China.

Radioactive Man continued to feature in Iron Man, and is employed by Iron Man's arch-enemy Mandarin. Chen is employed in his civilian capacity as a physicist by Stane International (taken over by Obadiah Stane). Radioactive Man appears in the graphic novel Deathtrap: The Vault, among other supervillains attempting to escape from the Vault. Chen, however, aids the heroes in preventing a nuclear reactor meltdown. Radioactive Man also features in an issue of The Sensational She-Hulk and once again in The Avengers.

After appearing in the second volume of Avengers that takes place in an alternate universe and briefly in Thunderbolts, the one-shot Heroes Reborn: Masters of Evil, the third volume of the Avengers, and alternate universe title Exiles, Radioactive Man features in the limited series Avengers: Earth's Mightiest Heroes.

Chen attempts to reform and in New Thunderbolts joins the Thunderbolts, a team composed almost entirely of reformed supervillains. During the Civil War storyline, the character aids heroes Mister Fantastic and Yellowjacket in building a holding prison for dissenting superpowered beings, and also battles the anti-registration heroes. A major development occurs in the title Thunderbolts when the group encounters the Elders of the Universe member the Grandmaster; the Radioactive Man absorbs an excessive amount of radiation and is forced to wear a radiation suit at all times. The radiation eventually subsides, but industrialist Norman Osborn convinces the character to retain the suit to distract the American public from his clearly Asian features and quell any lingering fears about his radioactivity. The Radioactive Man is featured in the one shot Thunderbolts: International Incident, the limited series Avengers/Invaders, one shot King-Size Hulk, and Thunderbolts: Reason In Madness before appearing briefly in the Secret Invasion storyline.

As part of the Thunderbolts, Radioactive Man fought Spider-Man and Anti-Venom during the New Ways to Die storyline; during the fight, Radioactive Man had a portion of his radiation powers drained by Anti-Venom. He continued with the team however, going after the super-hero Moon Knight. Radioactive Man was one of Songbird's strongest allies within the team, often supporting her when she fought against Osborn.

Ultimately, following the events of the Secret Invasion, Norman Osborn and Moonstone began the process of neutralizing the members of the Thunderbolts who would oppose Osborn in his plan to exploit the invasion for his own personal agenda, in order to gain more power. Osborn arranged for Chen to be deported back to China, leading to a bittersweet departure involving himself and Songbird.

The Radioactive Man reappears in The Mighty Avengers as part of People's Defense Force, China's indigenous group of metahumans. The Radioactive Man demonstrates that at close proximity he can safely absorb the radiation of Inhuman Xerogen crystals and presumably safely absorb Terrigen Mist. However, the People's Defense Force is largely defeated by an invading entity known as The Unspoken, a deposed former king of the Inhumans. The Unspoken is defeated in China by the Mighty Avengers.

During the Heroic Age storyline, a young man named Warhead appeared as a member of the Bastards of Evil, claiming to be the son of Radioactive Man. He has been shown to have similar powers, but killed himself in a mass explosion that killed hundreds of people.

Radioactive Man later released a Chinese dragon made of magic in the Federal Bank Reserve. While Captain America, Iron Man, the female Thor, and Vision fought the Chinese dragon, Spider-Man, Ms. Marvel, and Nova encounter Radioactive Man. The senior Avengers managed to destroy the dragon, but upon reuniting with their wards, they learn they let Radioactive Man escape. The young heroes explain they were forced to leave Radioactive Man alone as there was a man that needed to be rescued. The senior Avengers are proud of what the young heroes did as heroes are meant to protect people first and foremost and welcomes them to the team.

Igor Stancheck
Featured in the fourth volume of Black Panther, Igor Stancheck is a Russian mutate and is one of several mercenaries (including Rhino, Batroc, and the Vatican Black Knight), orchestrated by Klaw into invading the fictional African kingdom of Wakanda. The group makes an unsuccessful attempt to destroy the huge mound of the metal vibranium located at the heart of Black Panther's kingdom. He was killed in battle by Shuri using the Black Knight's Ebony Blade.

Powers and abilities
Chen Lu was a normal human until exposed to excessive amounts of radiation, which changed his skin coloring to an iridescent green, and allows him to manipulate radiation across the microwave spectrum. Abilities include radiation emission as heat, "hard" radiation (inflicting opponents with nausea, dizziness, and radiation poisoning), EMP emissions to deactivate machinery, hypnotic light and so much more. He can also absorb nuclear radiation without harm and convert it to energy for personal use such as physical enhancement or to cauterize wounds, create energy constructs such as force fields or golems out of radiation wit greater physical strength & resilience than his own, convert different energies into any other radiology form along the electromagnetic spectrum. He has shown the ability to leave behind "radiation pills", i.e. infusing a single individual with enough radiation to give him severe radiation poisoning and let the contamination spread in a large population. While it was briefly implied that his radioactive makeup along with some further enhancements of his powers had left him radioactive and unable to have contact with unshielded people, he was retconned to have always been in full control of his abilities. Even so, during his tenure in the Thunderbolts, Norman Osborn had his original costume replaced with a customized radiation suit, hiding his Asian features and quelling every lingering fear about his radioactive makeup. Chen Lu holds a Ph.D. in nuclear physics.

Igor Stancheck has the same or at least similar powers.

Related characters

Radioactive Kid
A promising young supervillain who took to wearing a hazmat suit to contain his nuclear powers, the Radioactive Kid would tender is affiliation with the rejuvenated team of Young Masters after he'd murdered his own father. He would temporarily be depowered through unknown means only to be repowered under equally mysterious circumstances when reappearing with the masters in the criminal underworld nation of Begalia under Constrictor's tutelage. Although taking on the Radioactive Man's surname moniker, he loathes his predecessor as a sellout and dismisses any relations to him whatsoever.

Warhead
One amongst a plethora of voluntary test subjects who had undergone advanced mental conditioning and radiological experimentation in order for better reception to assimilating the mindsets of those whom their newfound powers are based upon by the mysterious benefactor known as Superior. Neutron ray bombardment gave the youth who would come to be called Warhead powers similar to the Radioactive Man. While apart of a teen villainous cabal known as the Bastards of Evil, Warhead would take to reciting Dr. Chen's nihilistic and anarchical rhetoric whilst doing a suicide run to spread their message. Detonating like a nuclear bomb in the heart of Manhattan.

Other versions

Avataars: Covenant of the Shield
In the pages of Avataars: Covenant of the Shield, Radioactive Man's counterpart on Eurth is Green Death of the Minions of Evil. He aided them in their conflict with the Champions of the Realm whilst attacking Black Blade who they assumed had kidnapped Captain Avalon's son.

Heroes Reborn
In the Heroes Reborn universe, created by Franklin Richards, Radioactive Man appeared as a member of Loki's Masters of Evil.

MC2
Radioactive Man is still active in the MC2 reality.

House of M
The Radioactive Man makes an appearance in the House of M reality, on the team of villains  who attempted to break Baron von Strucker out of prison. They were stopped and apprehended by Captain Marvel (Carol Danvers), the Kree army, and Major Erik Josten.

In other media

Television
 The Chen Lu incarnation of Radioactive Man appears in the "Captain America" segment of The Marvel Super Heroes, voiced by Gillie Fenwick. This version is a member of Baron Heinrich Zemo's Masters of Evil.
 The Igor Stancheck incarnation of Radioactive Man appears in Black Panther, voiced by Rick D. Wasserman.
 The Chen Lu incarnation of Radioactive Man makes non-speaking appearances in The Avengers: Earth's Mightiest Heroes. Introduced in the episode "Hulk Vs. The World", he is imprisoned in the Cube. In the episode "The Casket of Ancient Winters", he fights Iron Man, Thor, and Black Panther at Stark Industries for the Arc Reactor's energy before he is defeated. In the episode "Assault on 42", having been imprisoned in the eponymous Prison 42, Lu volunteers to help the Avengers fight off Annihilus and the Annihilation Wave, though he is killed during the fight.
 An amalgamated incarnation of Radioactive Man appears in the Avengers Assemble episode "Secret Avengers", voiced by Roger Craig Smith. This version is identified as Igor Stancheck, sports Chen Lu's suit, and is a member of the Winter Guard. Sometime before the episode, he was captured by HYDRA and placed in a radiation-proof capsule to be used as a power source. Crimson Dynamo obtains the key to the capsule so the Winter Guard can free him, but when the destabilized facility threatens a nearby village, the Winter Guard work with the Secret Avengers to save it, leading to Crimson Dynamo and Falcon freeing Radioactive Man to dissolve the facility.

Video games
 The Chen Lu incarnation of Radioactive Man appears as a mini-boss in Marvel: Ultimate Alliance, voiced by James Sie. This version is a member of Doctor Doom's Masters of Evil.
 The Chen Lu incarnation of Radioactive Man appears as a boss in the PSP, PS2, and Wii versions of Marvel: Ultimate Alliance 2, voiced by Don Luce.
 The Chen Lu incarnation of Radioactive Man appears as a playable character in Lego Marvel's Avengers.
 The Chen Lu incarnation of Radioactive Man appears in Marvel: Avengers Alliance 2.

References

External links
 Radioactive Man (Chen Lu) at Marvel.com
 Radioactive Man at Marvel Wiki
 Radioactive Man (Chen Lu) at Comic Vine
 
 Radioactive Man (Igor Stancheck) at Marvel Wiki

Characters created by Jack Kirby
Characters created by Stan Lee
Chinese superheroes
Comics characters introduced in 1963
Comics characters introduced in 2005
Fictional characters with absorption or parasitic abilities
Fictional characters with nuclear or radiation abilities
Fictional characters with superhuman durability or invulnerability
Fictional nuclear engineers
Fictional nuclear physicists
Fictional Russian people
Marvel Comics characters with superhuman strength
Marvel Comics male supervillains
Marvel Comics mutates
Marvel Comics scientists